Wayupak Montra is 2010 Thai lakorn and the last installment of a four drama series called Four Hearts of the Mountains that aired on Channel 3. It starred Pakorn Chatborirak and Rasri Balenciaga.

Synopsis
Rasri Balenciaga plays the character of Thichakorn "Kati" a romance novel writer who goes by "Humming Bird." She is the daughter of a famous sorcerer. She decides to go research for her new novel in the vineyard. During her research she met Wayupak "Lom" (Pakorn Chatborirak), a playboy and the owner of Sailom Vineyard. Thichakorn "Kati" has sixth sens. She can see the female spirit that keeps following Wayupak "Lom" everywhere, but Wayupak doesn't believe her. He thinks that "Kati" is meddlesome and nonsensical, but he doesn't know when Thichakorn has been in his heart and he can't let her go.

Cast

Main cast
 Pakorn Chatborirak (Boy) as Wayupak "Lom" Adisuanrangsan
 Rasri Balenciaga (Margie) as Thichakorn "Kati"
 Nadech Kugimiya (Barry) as Akkanee "Fai" Adisuanrangsan
 Prin Suparat (Mark) as Pathapee "Din" Adisuanrangsan
 Urassaya Sperbund (Yaya) as Ajjima "Jeed" Posawat-Adisuanrangsan 
 Chalida Vijitvongthong (Mint) as Cher-Aim Vongvanisakunkit-Adisuanrangsan

Supporting cast
 Kimberly Ann Voltemas (Kim) as Thipthara "Nam" Adisuanrangsan-Rajaput
 Atichart Chumnanon (Aum) as Prince Phuwanate Rajaput	
 Sumonrat Vattanaselarat (Peemai) as Patchanee "Mink"
 Treepon Pormsuwan (Tob) as Panu
 Alexandra Stebert as Chantal
 Supitcha Mongkoljittanon (Prae) as Ruk
 Tatsapon Vivitawan (Peterpan) as Yom
 Suchao Pongvilai as Krairit
 Pawinar Chaleevsakul as Thip

Awards

References

Thai romance television series
2010s Thai television series
2010 Thai television series debuts
2010 Thai television series endings
Channel 3 (Thailand) original programming